Laccosaurus is an extinct monotypic genus of rhinesuchid temnospondyl amphibian, the type species being Laccosaurus watsoni.

History of study 
Laccosaurus watsoni was named by paleontologist Sidney H. Haughton in 1925 on the basis of a largely complete skull from the Dicynodon-Theriognathus subzone of the Daptocephalus Assemblage Zone in South Africa. This genus and/or species has sometimes been synonymized with Uranocentrodon, but this framework has not been adopted by recent workers. However, there is uncertainty related to the single referred specimen (BPI/1/4473); Eltink et al. (2019) consider this to belong to a different taxon, while Marsicano et al. (2017) considered it to belong to L. watsoni.

Anatomy 
Marsicano et al. (2017) were the most recent to diagnose this taxon and list the following unique combination of characters: "well-developed sensory sulci, infra-orbital sulcus with a step/S- like flexure between the orbit and the naris; width of interpterygoid vacuity pair greater than 90% of their length; vomers with field of denticles in symmetrical raised patches medially to the choanae; straight transverse vomerine tooth row; quadrate condyles projected behind the tip of the tabular horns; parasphenoid plate subrectangular, longer than wide, with a flat ventral surface; well-developed ‘pockets’, close to each other, thus the cristae musculares converge in the midline."

References

Permian amphibians of Africa
Monotypic vertebrate genera
Prehistoric vertebrate genera
Taxa named by Sidney H. Haughton
Fossil taxa described in 1925